Attman's Delicatessen is a Jewish delicatessen in Maryland with branches in Baltimore and Potomac. The deli serves Ashkenazi staples including corned beef, pastrami, brisket, Reuben sandwiches, knishes, latkes, pickles, kugel, and whitefish salad.

History
Attman's Delicatessen was first opened on Lombard Street in East Baltimore in 1915. Lombard Street was known as Corned Beef Row, once the heart of Jewish Baltimore and known for its many Jewish delis. The founder of the deli, Harry Attman, was a Jewish immigrant from a village near Kyiv, who settled in Baltimore in 1920 after learning the grocery trade in Providence, Rhode Island. His wife Ida was from Poland. The Attmans were religious and kept a kosher kitchen at home, but the corned beef and beef tongue came from non-kosher meat and the deli was never kosher. The deli was open during Shabbat, even during World War II when local rabbis tried to enforce Shabbat observance. Harry died in 1968 and his son Seymour took over the family business. By the 1970s, the clientele at Attman's Delicatessen had become predominantly non-Jewish.

The Montgomery County location was originally located in Cabin John in 2013, but relocated to Potomac in 2020.

See also
 List of Ashkenazi Jewish restaurants

References

External links
The Great American Deli Schlep

1915 establishments in Maryland
Ashkenazi Jewish culture in Baltimore
Ashkenazi Jewish restaurants
Jewish delicatessens in the United States
Jews and Judaism in Montgomery County, Maryland
Polish-Jewish culture in Baltimore
Potomac, Maryland
Restaurants in Baltimore
Secular Jewish culture in the United States
Ukrainian-Jewish culture in Baltimore